Our Homeland Movement (Hungarian: Mi Hazánk Mozgalom, MHM) is a Hungarian far-right political party founded by Ásotthalom mayor and former Jobbik Vice-President László Toroczkai and other Jobbik dissidents that left the organization after the party's leadership moved away from its radical beginnings.

History

On 14 October 2018, the party's politicians announced the party would organize a youth wing. On November 7, 2018, László Toroczkai announced to the media that 3 former Jobbik politicians, István Apáti, Erik Fülöp and János Volner joined his political party. János Volner later left.

In early 2019, the party made an alliance with the right-wing Hungarian Justice and Life Party and the agrarian Independent Smallholders, Agrarian Workers and Civic Party.

In May 2019, it was announced the party would be forming the National Legion, a uniformed 'self-defense' group similar to Magyar Gárda, the paramilitary wing Jobbik, which was banned in 2009.

In 2019 local elections, the party won 8 seats in counties' assemblies.

In 2022 parliamentary elections, the party surpassed the 5% threshold to enter parliament, winning 6 seats and forming the second largest faction in the Hungarian Parliament.

In 2022, the party hosted representatives of Alternative for Sweden, Alternative for Germany (AfD), the Dutch Forum for Democracy and the Bulgarian Revival party at the Hungarian-Serbian border, describing them as "allies". Our Homeland Movement party leader László Toroczkai, as well as AfD's Stefan Korte, both held individual speeches at Alternative for Sweden's election campaign meeting held in Rålambshovsparken in Stockholm on 6 August 2022.

Policies 
Mi Hazánk has been described as nationalist, right-wing populist, far-right and radical right. The party has anti-immigration and anti-Islam views, and was additionally accused of antiziganism, antisemitism and neo-fascism. The party holds national conservative, traditionalist and social conservative positions.

Although the party identifies itself as a "third way" party, opposing the policies of both the left-wing opposition and the right-wing governing party Fidesz, Our Homeland Movement and its ideologies have been described as far-right and extremist, and even as neo-fascist by the European Roma Rights Centre. The party supports the segregation of Hungarian and Roma pupils in educational institutions. The party also positioned themselves as anti-communist, anti-corruption, agrarianist and eco-conservative.

The party strongly opposes LGBT rights. After the release of a children's book, Meseország mindenkié, which features LGBT members and ethnic minorities as characters, the Deputy President of the party, Dóra Dúró, proceeded to call the book "homosexual propaganda" on a press conference, and promptly ripping the pages out of the book and then shredding them. The move caused significant controversy and garnered international attention. The party has called for a ban on LGBT pride marches. 

In an interview to Mandiner, party leader László Toroczkai described MHM as "a unique green party in Europe", stating that "we are unwilling to accept that only anti-social and anti-human liberal parties can be green parties. We think that those who do not want to protect our environment, our forests, our beautiful Great Plain, Lake Balaton, our rivers cannot really love their homeland". Thus, the party is sometimes referred to as supporting some form of green conservatism.

Amidst the COVID-19 pandemic, the party has protested lockdown measures set in place by the government, accusing them of "inciting panic" and ruining the country. The party also promotes vaccine hesitancy, launching a petition against using COVID-vaccines on children aged 12–15.

The party supports the reintroduction of the death penalty, and conscription.

History of leaders

Electoral results

National Assembly

European Parliament

Mayoral, the last elections was in 2019:

Ásotthalom – László Toroczkai (2013–2022) 
Cserháthaláp – Dávid Dócs (since 2015)
Homorúd – Balázs Éberling (since 2019)

Membership

References

External links
Our Homeland website
Our Homeland Party Facebook

 
Far-right political parties in Hungary
Nationalist parties in Hungary
Eurosceptic parties in Hungary
Anti-communist parties
Green conservative parties
Hungarian nationalism
Organizations that oppose LGBT rights
2018 establishments in Hungary
Political parties established in 2018
Jobbik breakaway groups
Social conservative parties
Anti-Romanian sentiment
Anti-Islam political parties in Europe
Antisemitism in Hungary
Antiziganism in Hungary